Deutsche Bauzeitung (stylized as db deutsche bauzeitung) is the oldest technical architecture publication periodical in Germany. The magazine was established in 1867. Its headquarters is in Leinfelden-Echterdingen. The publisher is Konrad Medien GmbH. The magazine targets both architects and civil engineers.

References

External links
 

1867 establishments in Germany
Visual arts magazines published in Germany
German-language magazines
Magazines established in 1867
Engineering magazines